Royal Arcade can refer to a number of structures:

 Royal Arcade, Boscombe
 Royal Arcade, Cardiff
 Royal Arcade, Charters Towers
 Royal Arcade, London
 Royal Arcade, Melbourne
 Royal Arcade, Norwich
 Royal Victoria Arcade, Ryde